Jaunutis (literally young man; baptized: Ioann, "Jawnuta", "John" or "Ivan"; ca. 1300 – after 1366) was the Grand Duke of Lithuania from his father Gediminas' death in 1341 until he was deposed by his elder brothers Algirdas and Kęstutis in 1345.

Sucession
According to Jan Tęgowski, a Polish historian, he was born probably between 1306 and 1309.

Jaunutis was not mentioned in any written sources prior to Gediminas' death. There are many theories why Gediminas chose Jaunutis, a middle son, as his successor. Some suggested that he was an acceptable compromise between pagan (Algirdas and Kęstutis) and Orthodox (Narimantas, Karijotas, Liubartas) sons of Gediminas. Others claimed that Jaunutis was the eldest son of Gediminas' second wife; thus the tradition that Gediminas was married twice: to a pagan and to an Orthodox duchess.

Rule
Very little is known about the years when Jaunutis ruled. Those were quite peaceful years, as the Teutonic Knights were led by the ineffective Ludolf König. His brothers were much more active: Algirdas attacked Mozhaysk, Livonian Order, defended Pskov, Kęstutis was helping Liubartas in succession disputes in Galicia–Volhynia. 

The Bychowiec Chronicle mentions that Jaunutis was supported by Jewna, presumed wife of Gediminas and mother of his children. She died  and soon after Jaunutis lost his throne. If he was indeed protected by his mother, then it would be an interesting example of influence held by queen mother in pagan Lithuania. However, a concrete stimulus might have been a major reise planned by the Teutonic Knights in 1345.

Later life
Jaunutis was supported by his brother Narimantas, who traveled to Jani Beg, Khan of the Golden Horde, to form an alliance against Algirdas and Kęstutis. Jaunutis was imprisoned in Vilnius, but managed to escape and went to his brother-in-law Simeon of Russia in Moscow. There Jaunutis was baptized as Ioann, but failed to solicit help (possibly because his sister Aigusta, wife of Simeon, died the same year). Both Jaunutis and Narimantas had to reconcile with Algirdas. Jaunutis became the Duke of Zasłaŭje. 

He is presumed to have died  because he is mentioned for the last time in a treaty with Poland in 1366, and not mentioned in a treaty with Livonia in 1367. He had three sons, Symeon Zaslawski, Grzegorz Słucki and Michal Zaslawski. Michal ruled Zasłaŭje until his death on August 12, 1399 in the Battle of the Vorskla River.

References

See also 
 Family of Gediminas – family tree of Jaunutis
 Gediminids

Grand Dukes of Lithuania
Gediminids